The 1933–34 Football League season was Birmingham Football Club's 38th in the Football League and their 21st in the First Division. They finished in 20th position in the 22-team division, two points above the relegation places. They also competed in the 1933–34 FA Cup, entering at the third round proper and losing to Leicester City in the fifth.

Twenty-nine players made at least one appearance in nationally organised competition, and there were nineteen different goalscorers. Half-backs Charlie Calladine was ever-present over the 45-match season, and Fred Roberts was leading scorer with just 8 goals, all of which came in the league.

At the end of the 1932–33 season, Leslie Knighton left the club to become manager of Chelsea, who had made him an offer that Birmingham were unable to match. Former Birmingham defender George Liddell, a schoolteacher by profession, was appointed to succeed him. Liddell kept up his Saturday evening radio broadcast, This Week's Sport in the Midlands, but only on days when Birmingham were not playing away from home.

Football League First Division

League table (part)

FA Cup

Appearances and goals

Players with name struck through and marked  left the club during the playing season.

See also
Birmingham City F.C. seasons

References
General
 
 
 Source for match dates and results: 
 Source for lineups, appearances, goalscorers and attendances: Matthews (2010), Complete Record, pp. 308–09.
 Source for kit: "Birmingham City". Historical Football Kits. Retrieved 22 May 2018.

Specific

Birmingham City F.C. seasons
Birmingham